Huhang high-speed railway may refer to:

 Huzhou–Hangzhou high-speed railway, opening in late 2022
 Shanghai–Hangzhou high-speed railway, opened in 2010